Blackpool North and Fleetwood was a parliamentary constituency represented in the House of Commons of the Parliament of the United Kingdom. From 1997 to 2010, it elected one Member of Parliament (MP) by the first past the post system of election.

Boundaries
The Borough of Blackpool wards of Anchorsholme, Bispham, Claremont, Greenlands, Ingthorpe, Norbreck, and Warbreck, and the Borough of Wyre wards of Bailey, Bourne, Cleveleys Park, Jubilee, Mount, Park, Pharos, Rossall, Victoria, and Warren.

The so-called "Golden Mile" of Blackpool and the fishing port of Fleetwood were paired in this seat. Those against the move at the time tried to argue that Fleetwood was a genteel place that had little, if anything, in common with its noisy neighbour to the south; then, as now, the Boundary Commission disagreed with the idea that Blackpool was a "den of vice", as one local Fleetwood newspaper claimed.

This seat was abolished for the 2010 general election, when Fleetwood was linked with Lancaster to create a new seat of Lancaster and Fleetwood. Meanwhile, the town of Thornton Cleveleys was split to create Blackpool North and Cleveleys.

Blackpool is a Unitary Authority but does not have enough electors to create two valid constituencies on its own without using electoral wards from Lancashire.

Members of Parliament

Elections

Elections in the 2000s

Elections in the 1990s

See also
 List of parliamentary constituencies in Lancashire

Notes and references

Parliamentary constituencies in North West England (historic)
Constituencies of the Parliament of the United Kingdom established in 1997
Constituencies of the Parliament of the United Kingdom disestablished in 2010
Politics of Blackpool